The Italian Catholic Diocese of Amelia, existed from the fifth century until 1983. In that year it was united into the new diocese of Terni, Narni, e Amelia. It was a suffragan of the archdiocese of Spoleto.

History
The Bishopric of Amelia appears on the pages of history relatively late. Ferdinando Ughelli mentions an Orthodolphus, Bishop, about the year 344. He mentions also Stephen, of whom there is no trace in history. 

Flavius, Bishop of Amelia, seems to have been present at a synod held at Rome, 14 November, 465, by Pope Hilary. Ughelli goes on to enumerate Tiburtius, Martinianus, and then a Sallustino present at a synod held in 502 under Pope Symmachus. Still further according to Ughelli, in the fifth century there was a Bishop of Amelia by name Sincerus. The Bollandists, however, show that the date of his episcopate is uncertain; there is question even of his very existence. 

A Bishop of Amelia still appears in 649 at the provincial synod held by Pope Martin at the Lateran. The city of Amelia had great political importance during the eighth century, when between the opposition of the iconoclast Byzantine emperors, and the conquering Lombard power in the centre of Italy, the temporal power of the popes grew from day to day.

Amelia Cathedral, the seat of the diocese until 1983, is now a co-cathedral of the Diocese of Terni-Narni-Amelia.

Ordinaries

Diocese of Amelia
Erected: 5th Century 
Latin Name: Amerinus
Metropolitan: Archdiocese of Spoleto 

Andrea Moriconi, O.S.A. (16 Jan 1410 – ) 
...
Filippo Ventorelli (10 Apr 1426 – 18 Dec 1442 Died) 
Ugolino Nacci, O.S.A. (14 Jan 1443 – 1444 Died) 
Ruggero Mandosi (6 Nov 1444 – 1484 Resigned) 
Cesare Nacci (31 Mar 1484 – 1504 Died) 
Giustiniano Moriconi (26 Aug 1504 – 1523 Resigned) 
Giovanni Domenico Moriconi (6 Jul 1523 – 1558 Resigned) 
Baldo Ferratini (28 Nov 1558 – 1562 Resigned) 
Bartolomeo Ferratini (iuniore) (9 Oct 1562 – 1571 Resigned) 
Mariano Vittori (17 Dec 1571 – 2 Jun 1572 Appointed, Bishop of Rieti) 
Giovanni Antonio Lazzari (9 Jun 1572 – 28 May 1591 Died) 
Antonio Maria Graziani (17 Feb 1592 – 1 Apr 1611 Died) 
Antonio Maria Franceschini (18 May 1611 – 25 Aug 1612 Died) 
Francesco Cennini de' Salamandri (1 Oct 1612 – 2 Oct 1623 Appointed, Bishop of Faenza) 
Domenico Pichi (20 Nov 1623 – 4 May 1633 Died) 
Torquato Perotti (20 Jun 1633 – Sep 1642 Died) 
Gaudenzio Poli (23 Feb 1643 – 28 May 1679 Died) 
Giuseppe Sallustio Fadulfi (27 Nov 1679 – 15 Jan 1685 Appointed, Bishop of Ascoli Piceno) 
Giovanni Battista Antici (9 Apr 1685 – 17 Jul 1690 Died)
Giuseppe Crispini (13 Nov 1690 – 12 May 1721 Died) 
Giovan Battista Renzoli (16 Jul 1721 – Sep 1743 Died) 
Giacomo Filippo Consoli (2 Dec 1743 – Jul 1770 Died) 
Tommaso Struzzieri, C.P. (10 Sep 1770 – 18 Dec 1775 Appointed, Bishop of Todi) 
Francesco Angelo Jacoboni (18 Dec 1775 – 30 Aug 1785 Died) 
Carlo Fabi (26 Sep 1785 – 31 Mar 1798 Died) 
Francesco Maria Gazzoli (11 Aug 1800 – 23 Sep 1805 Appointed, Bishop of Todi) 
Fortunato Maria Pinchetti (31 Mar 1806 – 17 Dec 1827 Resigned) 
Vincenzo Macioti (23 Jun 1828 – 1 Feb 1836 Appointed, Bishop of Ferentino) 
Mariano Brasca Bartocci (11 Jul 1836 – 12 Nov 1850 Resigned) 
Salvatore Valentini (17 Feb 1851 – 2 Aug 1855 Died) 
Nicola Pace (28 Sep 1855 – 6 May 1881 Resigned) 
Eusebio Magner, O.F.M. Cap. (13 May 1881 – 25 Sep 1882 Appointed, Bishop of Orvieto) 
Eugenio Clari (25 Sep 1882 – 16 Jan 1893 Appointed, Bishop of Viterbo e Tuscania) 
Vincenzo Giuseppe Veneri (16 Jan 1893 – 18 Mar 1906 Died) 
Francesco Maria Berti, O.F.M. Conv. (31 Aug 1907 – 1 Jul 1938 Resigned) 
Vincenzo Lojali (17 Aug 1938 Appointed – 14 Mar 1966 Died) 

13 September 1983 United with the Diocese of Terni e Narni to form the Diocese of Terni, Narni, e Amelia

Notes

References

External links
gcatholic.org page

Amelia